Daniel Gaspar (born August 27, 1955, in South Glastonbury, Connecticut) is a Portuguese-American football and goalkeeping coach who was an assistant coach for Carlos Queiroz's Iran team. He is a long-time assistant and consultant to Queiroz with whom he co-authored Project 2010 for the USSF in 1998, with the goal to create a blueprint for long-term improvements in US soccer.

Gaspar worked as a technical assistant and also a goalkeeping assistant coach for the Portuguese men's and youth national football teams and for the South African men's national team. He also worked as the goalkeeping coach for Sporting CP, S.L. Benfica and F.C. Porto in Portugal, and he was the assistant coach of J League Nagoya Grampus Eight in Japan.

Gaspar was the head coach of University of Hartford men's soccer team between 2005 and 2010. He resigned in March 2011. He played as a goalkeeper when he was a business management college student at the University of Hartford. He was also the associate head coach of Central Connecticut State University men's soccer team.

Gaspar was the head  coach of A-League Connecticut Wolves, the assistant coach of the NY/NJ MetroStars and he was also the associate head coach of Central Connecticut State University men's team. He also founded the Star Goalkeeper Academy in 1995, and he took over the Connecticut Soccer School in 2004 with the aim of  bringing his international coaching expertise to the youth level.

Coaching career 

Gaspar pursued his  passion for goalkeeping as a club and national team goalkeeping coach in Portugal. Since 1993, Gaspar has worked with Carlos Queiroz as a goalkeeping coach, technical adviser, and assistant coach for several club and national team coaching assignments. These included the Portuguese men's national team in 1994, and from 2009 to 2010, the Portuguese U16 and U18 men's and women's youth teams from 1992 to 1993, and the South African men's national football team in 2001, as well as Sporting CP, J League Nagoya Grampus Eight, and the NY/NJ MetroStars. In 2003 Gaspar worked with Luiz Felipe Scolari as the goalkeeping coach for the Portuguese men's national football team and also with José Antonio Camacho as the goalkeeping coach at S.L. Benfica, between 2003 and 2004.

On April 4, 2011, Gaspar became the assistant and goalkeeping coach for Iran's national team, alongside head coach Carlos Queiroz and assistant coach Omid Namazi. On June 18, 2013, Iran qualified for the 2014 FIFA World Cup, before qualifying for the 2015 AFC Asian Cup months later.

Head coaching record

References 

OSATv TouchLine With Dan Gaspar
University of Hartford Athletics
Dan Gaspar Resume
Dan Gapar: The American behind Iran's World Cup qualification
NY Times Article
Interview with Dan Gaspar

External links
 Official biography, Hartford Hawks

1955 births
University of Hartford people
Central Connecticut State University
Living people
Portuguese football managers
People from Glastonbury, Connecticut
American people of Portuguese descent
Hartford Hawks men's soccer players
Hartford Hawks men's soccer coaches
New York Red Bulls non-playing staff
Association football goalkeepers
Association football goalkeeping coaches
Association football players not categorized by nationality
American expatriate sportspeople in Iran
American expatriate sportspeople in South Africa
American expatriate sportspeople in Japan
S.L. Benfica non-playing staff
FC Porto non-playing staff
Sporting CP non-playing staff